Rattlesnake Knob is a summit in Sauk County, Wisconsin, in the United States. The summit lies adjacent to the Haystack Hills and about five miles west of Wisconsin Dells, Wisconsin along route H.

Rattlesnake Knob was named for the rattlesnakes seen there by settlers.

References

Landforms of Sauk County, Wisconsin
Mountains of Wisconsin